Ryan Thomson (born 16 September 1982 in Greenock) is a former professional Scottish footballer.

Thomson began his career in 2000 in the Canadian Professional Soccer League with London City. Midway through the season he received a tryout and secured a contract with Greenock Morton F.C. in the Scottish First Division.

While at HNK Hajduk Split, Thomson failed to make an appearance in the Prva HNL, the top tier of Croatian football, but did however play several matches in the Croatian Cup and in European matches.

Thomson made one appearance for Rot-Weiss Essen in the 2. Bundesliga during the 2004–05 season, as a substitute for Daniel Teixeira in a 0–0 draw with Rot-Weiß Erfurt.

References

External links 
 

1982 births
Living people
Footballers from Greenock
Scottish footballers
Scottish people of Canadian descent
Association football midfielders
2. Bundesliga players
London City players
Greenock Morton F.C. players
Celtic F.C. players
HNK Hajduk Split players
Rot-Weiss Essen players
Minnesota Thunder players
Tennis Borussia Berlin players
UConn Huskies men's soccer players
Expatriate footballers in Croatia
Expatriate footballers in Germany
Canadian Soccer League (1998–present) players
Scottish expatriate sportspeople in the United States
Expatriate soccer players in the United States
Scottish expatriate footballers
Scottish expatriate sportspeople in Canada
Expatriate soccer players in Canada